Most of the programs in Edu-Ware Services' initial product line, released in 1979 under the slogan "Unique software for the unique mind", were not typical of the intellectually challenging computer games and structured, pedagogically sound educational software for which the company would later become known.  Quickly  designed and programmed in Applesoft BASIC  primarily by co-founder Sherwin Steffin, most of these text-based programs were dropped from Edu-Ware's catalog when the company began developing products featuring high-resolution graphics in 1981.

E.S.P.

E.S.P. is a game giving players the opportunity to find out whether they possess extrasensory perception. While displaying a constantly changing graphic design on the screen, the program briefly flashes emotionally charged words, randomly chosen from a word list, on the screen.  The program then asks a series of questions to determine if the player's attitudes have been influenced by the subliminal messages.  A file-builder is included to allow players to insert new words in the data base.

The program was offered in both a stand-alone disk version and a compendium, along with E.S.P. and Zintar, called Party-Pak I.  However, Edu-Ware dropped the game from its product line by the time its August 1, 1980 catalog was issued.

Metri-Vert

Metri-Vert is an analytical program performing metric conversion calculations for length/distance, area, volume weight and temperature.  The program features a display page storing up to twenty conversions for easy reading and recall.

Perception

Perception is a puzzle game consisting of three games designed to challenge and improve players' visual skills. The first involves using game paddles to draw lines matching those drawn by the computer.  The second, based on a World War II test for spy candidates, tests players' power of observation by showing them only small glimpses of an abstract object as a narrow mask travels over it and then asking them to choose from among several objects what they had just seen.  The third modules tests player's visual memory by requiring them to distinguish sizes of identical shapes.  Players have control over the shape, display time, and presentation format.

Originally developed by Steffin before founding Edu-Ware, he wrote a second version of the program soon after establishing the publishing company. The program was offered as both a stand-alone versions, and in a compendium, along with Statistics and Compu-Read, called Edu-Pak I. Edu-Ware upgraded the program to high resolution graphics using its EWS3 graphics engine in 1982, renaming it Perception 3.0, which was featured in the company's catalogs until 1984.

Rescue

Rescue is a low-resolution graphics action game in which the player uses game paddles move his spaceship to intercept with a damaged ship randomly floating around the screen. The program was offered in both disk and cassette stand-alone versions, as well as in a compendium, along with War, called Rescue/War, but was dropped from Edu-Ware's catalog by 1980.

However, Edu-Ware dropped the game from its product line by the time its March 1, 1980 catalog was issued.

Statistics

Statistics is an analytical program performing many of the statistical calculations ordinarily found in FORTRAN driven SPSS programs of the time.  Calculations performed by the program included mean, variance, standard deviation, Pearson correlation, normal distribution, Chi-square test, and T-Test.

The program was offered in both disk and cassette stand-alone versions, as well as in a compendium, along with Perception and Compu-Read, called Edu-Pak I.

Originally developed by Steffin before founding Edu-Ware, the company upgraded the program to high resolution graphics using its EWS3 graphics engine in 1982, renaming it Statistics 3.0, which was featured in the company's catalogs until 1984.

Story Teller

Story Teller is a word game in which players are asked to type in a series of names, animals, colors, phrases and other words with which the program constructs a story.  Edu-Ware described it as being "more than just a mad-libs game" because it described and made use of all parts of speech.

Subliminal

Subliminal is a game testing whether players are influenced by subliminal messages. While the player is watching a constantly changing graphic design, the program quickly flashes an emotionally changed word on the screen.  The player then answers a series of questions to determine whether his attitudes has been affected by the subliminal message.  The program includes a file builder for modifying the data base from which the program randomly chooses the words to display.

The program was offered in both disk and cassette stand-alone versions, as well as in a compendium, along with Zintar, called Party-Pak I.  However, Edu-Ware dropped the game from its product line by the time its August 1, 1980 catalog was issued.

Text File Editor

Text file editor is a program allowing users to create, combine or manipulate sequential text files.  The program was advertised as useful for "unlocking the secrets" hidden in the files of Compu-Read, Network, Subliminal, and Zintar.

Unisolve

Unisolve: The Electronics Designer is an analytical program that calculates 24 equations encountered in engineering and design, including transmission line formulae, reactance, coil-winding models and modulation percentages.

War

War is a numeric strategy game occurring in ten rounds.  In each round, the program would display a number on the screen and allow the player to type another number in response.  The program would then use both numbers in a formula to determine the winner for that round, and the side that won the most number of rounds would win the game.  The challenge for the player was to determine the formula the program was using to determine the winner in each round.

The program was offered in both disk and cassette stand-alone versions, as well as in a compendium, along with Rescue, called Rescue/War, but was dropped from Edu-Ware's product line by the time its March 1, 1980 catalog was issued.

Zintar

Zintar is a drinking game in which players are instructed by the computer (randomly) to "take hits" while watching a series of color and black & white graphics.  A scoreboard kept track and designated the player who had been assigned the most hits as "The Mayor". It was Pederson's first Apple II program written strictly for fun; Sherwin Steffin supplied the graphics. Edu-Ware offered it for sale after being encouraged by an early mail order distributor. This controversial party game was advertised in Edu-Ware's catalogs as being banned by Apple II retailer Rainbow Computing.  However, Edu-Ware dropped the game from its product line by the time its August 1, 1980 catalog was issued.

See also
 Space (role-playing game series)
 Compu-Read

References

 
Edu-Ware
Edu-Ware